The Red Rider (German: Der rote Reiter) is a 1922 dramatic novel by the Austrian writer Franz Xaver Kappus.

Adaptations
It has been made into films on two occasions. A 1923 silent film The Red Rider starring Fern Andra and a 1935 sound film The Red Rider directed by Rolf Randolf and starring Iván Petrovich and Camilla Horn.

References

Bibliography
 James L. Limbacher. Haven't I seen you somewhere before?: Remakes, sequels, and series in motion pictures and television, 1896-1978. Pierian Press, 1979.

1922 German-language novels
German novels adapted into films